Lucius Iwejuru Ugorji  (born January 13, 1952 in Naze, Nigeria) is the Roman Catholic Archbishop of Owerri Archdiocese.

Clerical career 
Lucius Iwejuru Ugorji was ordained a priest on April 16, 1977.

On April 2, 1990, Pope John Paul II appointed him Bishop of Umuahia. The Apostolic Pro-Nuntius in Nigeria, Archbishop Paul Fouad Tabet, consecrated him bishop on July 1 of the same year in Umuahia Cathedral; co-consecrators were the Bishop of Awka, Albert Kanene Obiefuna, and the Bishop Emeritus of Umuahia, Anthony Gogo Nwedo.

Pope Francis additionally appointed him Apostolic Administrator of the Diocese of Ahiara on Feb. 19, 2018, for the duration of a vacancy that came about due to the crisis surrounding Peter Okpaleke, the bishop who was rejected by many priests in the diocese due to his ancestry.

Pope Francis appointed Ugorji archbishop of Owerri on March 6, 2022.

Suspected plagiarism 
Ugorji's dissertation on the ethical principle of double effect was submitted to Bruno Schüller (1925–2007) at the University of Münster in 1984, and published as a book in 1985. It was well-received by several moral theologians. But Alkuin Schachenmayr noted in a 2022 essay in Forum Katholische Theologie that numerous passages of the doctoral thesis were originally published by other authors, although Ugorji presented their texts as his intellectual property. Several parts were copied from popular reference works, other parts from an American dissertation published in 1935.

Weblinks 
 Entry on 
 Profile on Umuahia Diocese's homepage

References

External links 

1952 births
Living people
Nigerian Roman Catholics
Nigerian Roman Catholic bishops
People from Owerri
People from Umuahia
University of Münster alumni
21st-century Roman Catholic bishops
20th-century Roman Catholic bishops